Toshie Tsukui (born 30 July 1975) is a Japanese former field hockey player who competed in the 2008 Summer Olympics.

References

External links
 

1975 births
Living people
Japanese female field hockey players
Olympic field hockey players of Japan
Field hockey players at the 2008 Summer Olympics
Asian Games medalists in field hockey
Field hockey players at the 2002 Asian Games
Field hockey players at the 2006 Asian Games
Asian Games silver medalists for Japan
Asian Games bronze medalists for Japan
Medalists at the 2002 Asian Games
Medalists at the 2006 Asian Games